Cerastium aleuticum, common name Aleutian mouse-ear chickweed, is a plant species endemic to the US State of Alaska. It is found only on islands, not on the Alaskan mainland: Aleutian, St. Lawrence, St. Paul, Popof, and Kodiak Islands. It is found on rocky slopes and mountainsides up to an elevation of 700 m.

Cerastium aleuticum is a perennial herb spreading by means of underground rhizomes. Stems are branched, up to 7 cm long, covered with soft hairs. Flowers are single or in groups of 2 or 3, white. Capsules are cylindrical, up to 11 mm long.

References

aleuticum
Flora of Alaska
Plants described in 1936
Flora without expected TNC conservation status